Valerie Van Ost (25 July 1944 – 10 September 2019) was an English actress.

Acting career
At school, Van Ost became the youngest adult dancer at the London Palladium before moving into films and television at age 18. She appeared in four Carry On films - Carry On Cabby (1963), Carry On Don't Lose Your Head (1967), Carry On Doctor (also 1967) and Carry On Again Doctor (1969). Her other film roles included The Beauty Jungle (1964), Mister Ten Per Cent (1967), Casino Royale (1967), Corruption (1968), The Smashing Bird I Used to Know (1969), Incense for the Damned (1971), and the Hammer horror film The Satanic Rites of Dracula (1973). She appeared as the dim-witted Penny in an episode of The Avengers entitled "Dead Man's Treasure" (1967), and a year later was considered for the part of Diana Rigg's replacement as Steed's sidekick.  She also appeared in the 1966 mini-episode of the same series entitled "The Case of the Missing Corpse" (broadcast in the U.S. but not in the U.K.) made to advertise the change to colour of the previously black and white production.

Post-acting
Van Ost retired from performing in 1982 to form a casting company with her husband, Andrew Millington.

Death
Van Ost died from liver cancer on 10 September 2019 at the age of 75.

Filmography

References

External links

1944 births
2019 deaths
People from Berkhamsted
English film actresses
English television actresses
Actresses from Hertfordshire
20th-century English actresses